is a 2017 Japanese variety show held by Tsuburaya Productions. The series is available every Wednesday under the pay-per-view service Amazon Video, succeeding Ultraman Orb: The Origin Saga.

Format
The series features the presenters, a Japanese comedian Daikichi Hakata and Monobright bassist Hiroyuki Deguchi, both are fans of Tokusatsu as they review the past Heisei Era Ultra Series. The reviewed series are Ultraman Tiga to Mebius, with spin-offs and movie adaptations also included.

Other than that, it features guest appearances of Ultra Warriors and past actors of Ultra Series.

Ultras
Ultraman Tiga
Ultraman Mebius
Ultraman Dyna
Ultraman Gaia
Ultraman Agul
Ultraman Cosmos
Ultraman Justice
Ultraman Nexus
Ultraman Max
Ultraman Hikari

Episodes

Cast

Guests

Notes

References

External links
Ultraman The Prime at Tsuburaya Productions 
Ultraman The Prime at Amazon Video 

Ultra television series
Amazon Prime Video original programming